Xavier Luissint (born 13 January 1984) is a French footballer who plays for VW Hamme.

External links
 

French footballers
Belgian Pro League players
1984 births
Living people
AS Saint-Étienne players
Olympique de Valence players
K.V. Oostende players
Cercle Brugge K.S.V. players
RC Épernay Champagne players
Challenger Pro League players
Expatriate footballers in Belgium
French expatriate footballers
Footballers from Paris
Association football defenders